is a town located in Okhotsk Subprefecture, Hokkaido, Japan.

As of September 2016, the town has an estimated population of 11,897 and a population density of 16 persons per km2. The total area is 736.97 km2.

Shiretoko National Park is situated within Shari.

During World War 2 on 22 June 1945 Shari came under attack from the submarine USS Barb. This attack was notable for being the first submarine-based rocket attack against a surface target.

Notable people from Shari
Tatsuhikari Kumagoro, former sumo ringer
Tsutomu Takebe, politician

Climate

References

External links

Official Website 

 
Towns in Hokkaido